Nancy Swain Overton (born Anne Swain; February 6, 1926 – April 5, 2009) was an American pop singer and songwriter.

Biography
Overton first formed a singing group with her sister Jean Swain and two college friends, Bix Brent and Pauli Skindlov in 1946. The group toured with orchestra leader Tommy Tucker for 6 months, was known as Tommy Tucker's Two Timers, and recorded the song "Maybe You'll Be There" with bandleader Tommy and his lead singer Don Brown. Pauli left the group and was replaced by Ellie Decker, who had previously sung with The Meltones (Mel Tormé's quartet). The band also then sang with singer and band leader Ray Heatherton from whom they acquired the bands' next moniker The Heathertones. After Decker left the group to get married, she was replaced as lead singer by Marianne McCormick. The Heathertones disbanded in 1953.

Personal life
Overton, who married jazz pianist/composer/arranger Hall Overton, sang "Nobody's Heart" as a solo vocalist with the Teddy Charles Quartet in 1954. In 1957, Janet Ertel of The Chordettes, though still recording with the group, elected not to continue touring. Ertel was married to Archie Bleyer, the owner of Cadence Records, the group's label. Nancy Overton was invited to appear with The Chordettes for live appearances and did so until the group broke up in the early 1960s. She didn't record with The Chordettes on their label, Cadence Records; however she did appear on some "Stars For Defense" programs.

She moved to Englewood, New Jersey, in the 1960s, at the recommendation of Dizzy Gillespie. After her husband Hall Overton died in 1972, she retired from show business and worked for Prentice-Hall Publishers as an editorial assistant.

In the early 1990s, The Chordettes regrouped with Overton, Jean Swain, Doris Alberti, and  Lynn Evans, who had been a member of the Chordettes from 1952 until the group disbanded in 1961, doing shows ranging from a doo wop concert to touring with Eddy Arnold. A live cassette of a concert in Branson, Missouri was recorded.

Family
Rick Overton, comic actor/writer, is the son of Hall and Nancy Overton.

Death
She moved to Blairstown, New Jersey in 1982 and died there at the age of 83, from esophageal cancer on April 5, 2009.

Discography

With Bob Brookmeyer
The Dual Role of Bob Brookmeyer (Prestige, 1954)

References

External links
 Obituary in NorthJersey.com

1926 births
2009 deaths
American women pop singers
Deaths from cancer in New Jersey
Deaths from esophageal cancer
People from Blairstown, New Jersey
People from Englewood, New Jersey
Singers from New York City
Traditional pop music singers
People from Port Washington, New York
20th-century American women singers
20th-century American singers
21st-century American women